Julia Caitlin Annis (born April 11, 1980) is a Canadian actress, known for her roles as Eva on Total Drama, and Amber D’Alessio in Mean Girls.

Born in Toronto, Ontario, Canada, Chantrey is the winner of the Gemini Award for Best Performance by an Actress in a  Dramatic Role. In 2013, Chantrey performed the role of Nina opposite Oscar-nominee Jessica Chastain in Oscar-winner Guillermo del Toro's horror film Mama.

Filmography

Film

Television

References

External links 

 Julia Chantrey at IMDb

1980 births
Living people
Actresses from Toronto
Canadian Screen Award winners
Canadian child actresses
Canadian film actresses
Canadian television actresses
Canadian voice actresses
20th-century Canadian actresses
21st-century Canadian actresses